Joseph Aloysius Fernandez (21 June 1927 – 14 November 2010), also known as Joss Fernandez, was an Indian politician and a Member of India's Lower House from the state of Karnataka.

He was member of the Karnataka Legislative Assembly from March 1983 to April 1989 as member of Janata Dal.

References 

1927 births
2010 deaths
India MPs 1989–1991
People from Bangalore
Janata Dal politicians
Karnataka MLAs 1983–1985
Karnataka MLAs 1985–1989